Maria Jane Williams (c.1795 – 10 November 1873) was a 19th-century Welsh musician and folklorist born at Aberpergwm House, Glynneath in Glamorgan, South Wales. She rescued many Welsh songs from obscurity, including Y Deryn Pur (The Gentle Bird) and Y Ferch o'r Sger.

Life
Maria Jane Williams was born in either 1794 or 1795, at Aberpergwm House, Glynneath. She was the second daughter of Rees Williams (d. 1812) of Aberpergwm in the Vale of Neath, Glamorganshire, by his wife Ann Jenkins of Fforest Ystradfellte. She lived in Blaen Baglan but in her later years, at a house called Ynys-las, near Aberpergwm House. She died in 1873 and is buried at St Cadoc’s Church in the grounds of Aberpergwm House.

Education and scholarly studies
Maria Jane Williams was well educated, a supporter of the Welsh language and traditions and had an extensive knowledge of music. She was especially acclaimed for her singing and was an accomplished player of the guitar, and the harp, having been taught by the famous harpist Parish-Alvars. Henry Fothergill Chorley said that she was "the most exquisite amateur singer he had ever heard" She acquired the name ‘Llinos’ (the Welsh word for linnet), and was associated with the Welsh cultural society known as Cymreigyddion y Fenni and made her home a focus for ‘Celtic Renaissance’ enthusiasts.

Book of Fairy Tales
In 1826–7 she made a collection of the fairy tales of the Vale of Neath, which was published in the supplemental volume of Crofton Croker's ‘Irish Fairy Legends’ and subsequently reprinted in an abridged form in the ‘Fairy Mythology’ of Thomas Keightley who had suggested that she should make the collection.

Book of Welsh folk songs
The fourth eisteddfod at Abergavenny in October 1837 was under the patronage of Lady Llanover, who later became her friend. At this event she was awarded the prize for the best collection of unpublished Welsh music. It was published in 1844 under the title of ‘The Ancient National Airs of Gwent and Morgannwg’. Despite later criticisms this book remains an important contribution to the knowledge of traditional Welsh music. The book contains 43 songs with Welsh words and accompaniments for the harp or piano. and also provides notes on the songs and a list of persons for whom copies of the work had been printed, which evidenced how well patronised Welsh folk song was during this period. The book has since been re-issued by the Welsh Folk Song Society with a contemporary introduction and notes by Daniel Huws. Through this collection she rescued many songs, the best known  being Y Deryn Pur (The Gentle Dove) and Y Ferch o'r Sger (The Maid of Sker). In October 1838, at the ensuing Eisteddfod, she won a prize for the best arrangement of any Welsh air for four voices

Lucy Broadwood, an ex-president and mentor of the Folk Song Society, and one of the earliest collectors of Celtic folk songs, in a scathing attack on the folklorists of the day, claimed that during the period 1800 to 1850, in Wales, as in the rest of Britain, ‘a mass of "traditional" and so-called "Druidical" songs was published which does not bear critical investigation.’ She claimed, however, that Maria Jane Williams was one of only two people in Britain at this time who were the exception to this rule. Maria Jane Williams claimed that: ‘The songs were given as...obtained,...in their wild and original state; no embellishments of the melody have been attempted, and the accompanying words are those sung to the airs.’

Maria Jane Williams also assisted John Parry to produce the ‘Welsh Harper’ and John Thomas consulted her before publishing his two volumes of Welsh airs.

References

1790s births
1873 deaths
British performers of early music
Women performers of early music
Welsh folk musicians
19th-century Welsh women singers
Welsh philanthropists
People from Glamorgan
19th-century British philanthropists